Ivan Gerald Haines (born 14 September 1968) is an English former professional footballer who played as a central defender.

Born in Chatham, Haines played for Gillingham between 1987 and 1991, making 51 appearances in the Football League.

References

1968 births
Living people
Sportspeople from Chatham, Kent
Footballers from Kent
English footballers
Gillingham F.C. players
Association football central defenders